Sara Ainhoa Concepción Sálamo (born 20 January 1992), simply known as Sara Sálamo, is a Spanish actress known for her performance in television series such as Arrayán, B&b, de boca en boca and Brigada Costa del Sol.

Biography 
Sara Ainhoa Concepción Sálamo was born on 20 January 1992 in Santa Cruz de Tenerife, in the Canary Islands. Following her participation in a short film authored by her father at age 11, she developed an interest in performing arts. She moved to Madrid at age 18 to pursue a career as an actress. In 2012, she had her television debut with a minor role in the television series Toledo, cruce de destinos, temporarily moving to Málaga to star in the Andalusian regional soap opera Arrayán.

In 2013, Sálamo made her feature film debut with the film Tres 60, a teen movie in which she performed a student of Fine Arts. She featured in supporting roles in series such as La que se avecina, Aída, Con el culo al aire and Águila Roja. Her first major role in national television was her performance as Cayetana in the workplace dramedy B&b, de boca en boca, which aired from 2014 to 2015 in Telecinco. By 2017, she entered a relationship with footballer Isco Alarcón, with whom she had had two children.

She featured in the 2018 films Perdida and Everybody Knows, also starring as "La Buhíta" in the 2019 crime series Brigada Costa del Sol set in the Costa del Sol.

Self-described as "actress, feminist and animal rights activist", Sálamo has been engaged in online controversies pitting her against pro-bullfighting pressure groups.

Filmography 

Film

Television

References

External links

1992 births
21st-century Spanish actresses
Actresses from the Canary Islands
Spanish film actresses
Spanish television actresses
Living people